Jason Davidson (born 21 May 1993) is a Namibian cricketer who debuted at first-class level for the Namibian national side in September 2012. He was selected to be part of the Namibian cricket squad for the 2015 ICC World Twenty20 Qualifier. During the tournament he was suspended for using an illegal bowling action in their match against the Netherlands.

References

External links
ESPNcricinfo player profile

1993 births
Living people
Namibian cricketers
Cricketers from Windhoek